The Beckoning Flame is a 1915 American silent drama film directed by Charles Swickard and featuring Henry Woodruff, Tsuru Aoki, and Rhea Mitchell in pivotal roles.

Cast
Henry Woodruff as Harry Dickson
Tsuru Aoki as Janira
Rhea Mitchell as Elsa Arlington
J. Frank Burke as Ram Dass
Louis Morrison as Prince Chandra
J. Barney Sherry as Muhmed
Roy Laidlaw as Hawes
Joseph J. Dowling as Baron (credited as Joseph Dowling)

References

External links 
 

1915 drama films
1915 films
American silent feature films
American black-and-white films
Films directed by Charles Swickard
1915 short films
Silent American drama films
1916 drama films
1916 films
1910s American films